The R3 is a ring road around the city of Charleroi, Belgium. It is about 33 km long, with 2 lanes in each direction on most of its length and short sections with 2 + 3 lanes. While Charleroi is one of only few Belgian cities with a complete ring road, the R3 road only covers the western, southern and eastern portions of the ring, the northern part being covered by the A15 motorway.

History 
The R3 was opened in phases from 1983 till 1988.

 1983: Châtelineau - Heppignies.
 1984: Marcinelle (Hublinbu) - Châtelineau.
 1985: Gouy-lez-Piéton - Trazegnies.
 1987: Fontaine l'Evêque - Montigny-le-Tilleul.
 1988: Trazegnies - Fontaine l'Evêque.

Course and exit list

References
 Wegen-Routes
 Autosnelwegen.net

R3
Transport in Charleroi
Ring roads in Belgium